The 1972 Tokyo WCT, was a men's tennis tournament played on indoor hard courts at the National Tennis Stadium in Tokyo, Japan that was part of the 1972 World Championship Tennis circuit. It was the inaugural edition of the tournament and was held from 4 October through 7 October 1972. Ken Rosewall won the singles title and the accompanying $10,000 first prize money.

Finals

Singles
 Ken Rosewall defeated  Fred Stolle 7–5, 6–3, 6–3

Doubles
 John Newcombe /  Fred Stolle defeated  John Alexander /  Ken Rosewall 7–6, 6–4

References

Tokyo WCT
Tokyo WCT
1972 in Japanese tennis
Tennis tournaments in Japan